Gerwyn Williams (22 April 1924 – 10 February 2009) was a Welsh rugby union player, coach and author.

Biography
Williams was born in Glyncorrwg, Glamorgan, the son of Ephraim and Catherin (Hopkins) Williams.  He attended Port Talbot County School and Loughborough College after serving in the Royal Navy during World War II.

Rugby career
Williams began playing rugby in grammar school, and won his first cap as a U-15 player with Wales against England.  He continued at Loughborough, playing on the College XV.  As a professional, Williams played fullback for Llanelli RFC and London Welsh, as well as on the Wales national rugby union team from 1950 to 1954.  He won his first senior cap in the Triple Crown deciding match against Ireland in 1950.  In 1952, Williams played on the Grand Slam winning team, and he was the fullback in the last Wales team to beat the New Zealand All Blacks.

Post-rugby career
Williams was forced to retire from rugby due to a recurring collar-bone injury.  In his post-rugby career, he became a school PE teacher in Harrow Grammar school, before moving to private education at Whitgift School in Croydon. He was better known for his frequent use of the slipper than any great craft as a maths or geography master.

Williams was the author of four rugby union training manuals:
 Modern Rugby (1964)
 Schoolboy Rugby (1966)
 Tackle Rugger This Way (1968)
 Tackle Rugger (1975)

He died in Clare, Suffolk.

References

1924 births
2009 deaths
Barbarian F.C. players
Devonport Services R.F.C. players
Llanelli RFC players
London Welsh RFC players
People educated at Port Talbot County Boys' Grammar School
Royal Navy personnel of World War II
Rugby union fullbacks
Rugby union players from Neath Port Talbot
Taibach RFC players
Wales international rugby union players
Welsh rugby union coaches
Welsh rugby union players
Welsh sportswriters